is a Japanese artist of the nihonga and ink painting genre.

He currently lives and works in Kyoto. He graduated from the Faculty of Arts and Design at Osaka Seikei University, where he learned and matured his craft in both Japanese painting. Since his first solo exhibition "Beautiful Thing" in Kyoto in 2006, he has been expressing his love and devotion for nature and townships primarily through his unique and striking black and white paintings. He has also participated in several high profile and successful solo and group exhibitions throughout Japan in recent years.

Artwork
By studying on his own, Syoh Yoshida pursued the expression of ink painting. Starting at the age of 20, he focused his efforts on flower paintings, using sumi-ink and gofun-chalk on eginu-silk. In cooperation with those who were qualified in the Kyoto Hyogu traditional craftsmenship, he tailored his works on the hanging scrolls and folding screens that had been arranged in a modern way, based on the concept of "Hyogu suited to modern architecture", while maintaining the classical Japanese mounting style.

Being in prominent collections, his works have attracted the attention of numerous collectors, both at home and abroad. As a result, he has been engaged in a wide range of activities as a creator, participating solo exhibitions and group exhibitions both at home and abroad, with Kyoto as his base, as well as participating in all kinds of design projects that took advantage of his inherent design sensibilities.

In recent years, in collaboration with long-established traditional artisans, such as those specializing in kimono, Kyoto lacquerware and Kyoto fans, whose art had been revered for many centuries, he created yukata (a casual summer kimono), lacquerware and fans that featured his original design. Having also attracted avid attention by the works which he had achieved in cooperation with the Grand Master Potter of tea ceremony utensils and the Grand Master of flower arrangement whose art had continued for centuries in Kyoto, he has been extremely active as a young ink painter and a man of culture who represented Kyoto.

Educations
2008 Postgraduate Degree in Japanese Painting, Faculty of Art & Design, Osaka Seikei University
2006 Bachelor of Fine Arts Degree in Japanese Painting of Faculty of Art & Design, Osaka Seikei University
2004 Associate of Arts Degree in Japanese Painting of Seian Junior College of Art & Design
2001 Completion of Japanese Painting Course, Kawaijuku Educational Institution of Arts

Solo exhibitions
2015
Water Ink, Nagoya Matsuzakaya, Aichi, Japan
2011 	
White Lake, JR Osaka Mitsukoshi Isetan, Osaka, Japan
2009
Insphere, imura art gallery, Kyoto, Japan
2008
Distant Promise, Harbour City, Hong Kong
Night Trace, Shinjuku Takashimaya, Tokyo, Japan
2007
Day full of rain, CASPER'S Gallery, Tokyo, Japan
Day full of rain, imura art gallery, Kyoto, Japan
2006
Beautiful Thing spaceB, Kyoto, Japan

Group exhibitions
2016
UZUMASA EDO SAKABA, Toei Kyoto Studio Park , Kyoto, Japan
Minotti Living Attendant 2016, Minotti Japnan, Tokyo, Japan
New Wave of Japanese Painter, Shizuoka Matsuzakaya, Shizuoka, Japan
Contemporary Japanese Ink 2016, The National Art Center, Tokyo, Japan
Contemporary Japanese Ink, Rai Sanyo Commemorative Cultural Foundation, Hiroshima
Contemporary Japanese Ink, Nagai Garou, Tokyo, Japan
2015
New Wave of Japanese Painter, Shizuoka Matsuzakaya, Shizuoka, Japan
Modern Kyoto Ceramic 2015 - Rimpa, The Oldest Zen Temple Kenninji, Kyoto, Japan
Charity Dinner for BirdLife International in Kyoto - Presented by Amon Miyamoto -, Azekura, Kyoto, Japan
Contemporary Japanese Ink 2015, The National Art Center, Tokyo, Japan
Chikusen - Yukata Exhibition (Takashimaya Nippon Monogatari Project), Takashimaya,(traveled throughout each Takashimaya department store), Japan
+81 GALLERY Anniversary Exhibition, +81 GALLERY, New York, US
Towards a Celebration of 400 Years of Rimpa School of Japanese Painting, The Museum of Kyoto, Kyoto, Japan
2014
Contemporary Japanese Ink 2014, The National Art Center, Tokyo, Japan
GRAPHIC PASSPORT 2014 IN NEW YORK , NYU, IRIS & B.GERALD CANTOR, FILM CENTER NYU, +81 GALLERY and more, New York, US
2013
AICHI TRIENNALE Partner Ship Exhibition | MATSUZAKAYA ART SELECTION | YAMATO DYNAMICS, Nagoya Matsuzakaya, Aichi, Japan
ART FAIR TOKYO 2013, Tokyo International Forum, Tokyo, Japan
2012
MEME | Genes of Culture in Art - Exploration of Tradition, Technique and Modernity in Calligraphy, Copperplate Prints, and Japanese Paintings, Shibuya Hikarie, Tokyo, Japan
The 5th Kaii Higashiyama Memorial Award for Nikkei Nihonga Grand Prize, The Ueno Royal Museum, Tokyo, Japan
2011 	
"FANATIC MONOCHROME", spaceB, Kyoto, Japan
"ISETAN JAPAN SENSES", Shinjuku Isetan, Tokyo, Japan
2010
"BMW ART CAR", Hanshin BMW, Osaka, Japan
2009
"ART FAIR TOKYO 2009", Tokyo International Forum & TOKYO BLDG.TOKIA.GALLERIA, Tokyo, Japan
2008
"The 11th Exhibition of the Taro Okamoto Award for Contemporary Art", Taro Okamoto Museum of Art, Kanagawa, Japan
2008
"The 2nd Art Exchange Exhibition of the Osaka Seikei University and Chung-Ang University", Chung-Ang University, Seoul, Japan
2007
"The Kyoto Arts and Crafts Award for Spirited Young Artist 2007", The Museum of Kyoto, Kyoto, Japan
2006
"The Kyoto Art Center Summer Vacation Program – Under the Cloud", Kyoto Art Center, Kyoto, Japan
"Osaka Seikei University and Chung-Ang University Art Exchange Exhibition", TOPOHAUS GALLERY, Seoul, Japan
2005
"The Panorama Painting Exhibition", Tokushima Modern Art Museum, Tokushima, Japan
"Beyond the Image", GALLERY WKS, Osaka, Japan
"ART BEAT KYOTO 2005", Rissei school, ART ZONE, Shinpukan, Kyoto, Japan
2004
"ART UNIV. 2004", Campus Plaza Kyoto, Kyoto, Japan
"CANZUME", GALLERY MARONIE, Kyoto, Japan
"ALTERNATIVE MOOD OF YUZEN", Kyoto Art Center, Kyoto, Japan
"B-port", spaceB, Kyoto, Japan

Awards
2016 The 8th Koji Kinutani Memorial Award, Nominee
2015 Towards a Celebration of 400 Years of Rimpa School of Japanese Painting, Nominee
2012 The 5th Kaii Higashiyama Memorial Award for Nikkei Nihonga Grand Prize, Nominee
2007 The 11th Exhibition of the Taro Okamoto Award for Contemporary Art, Nominee
2006 The Kyoto Arts and Crafts Award for Spirited Young Artist 2007, Nominee
2005 InterMedia Research Center, Osaka Seikei University – Student Exhibition Plan Competition 2006, winner

Private collections
1223 GENDAIKAIGA – Contemporary Painting Collection, Tokyo, Japan

References

External links
 SYOH YOSHIDA

Japanese painters
Living people
1984 births
Artists from Aichi Prefecture